Joana Bolling (born 6 April 1995) is an Argentine handball player who plays as a left wing for Spanish club Elche Mustang and the Argentina women's national team.

She was selected to represent Argentina at the 2019 World Women's Handball Championship.

Bolling has grown up in La Punta, San Luis Province. In 2016, she donated one of her kidneys to her father, former basketball player Elnes Bolling, who is originally from the United States Virgin Islands and has developed most of his playing career in Argentina. Her mother is of Italian descent.

References

External links

1995 births
Living people
Argentine female handball players
People from Uruguay Department
Argentine people of United States Virgin Islands descent
Argentine people of Italian descent
Argentine expatriate sportspeople in Spain
Expatriate handball players
Sportspeople from Entre Ríos Province